Félines may refer to the following places in France:

 Félines, Ardèche, a commune in the department of Ardèche
 Félines, Haute-Loire, a commune in the department of Haute-Loire
 Félines-Minervois, a commune in the department of Hérault
 Félines-sur-Rimandoule, a commune in the department of Drôme
 Félines-Termenès, a commune in the department of Aude